Ethnikos Achna Football Club, commonly known as Ethnikos Achna, or simply Ethnikos, is a Cypriot football club based in the village of Achna. Founded in 1968, the club currently plays in the Cypriot Second Division. Ethnikos' home ground is the Dasaki Stadium, which has a capacity of 7000 seats. They are the only Cypriot team to win a UEFA competition.

History
The club played in the Cypriot Second Division until 1983 when it was promoted to the Cypriot First Division but was immediately relegated. Ethnikos was promoted to the First Division again in 1986 and stayed there for four seasons. Another two years in the Second Division ended with promotion to the First Division in 1992, where Ethnikos have remained until 2018 when they were relegated again.

The team's best overall national ranking is fourth in the 1994–95, 1997–98 and 2006–07 seasons. The club participated in the Cypriot Cup final twice; once in 2002, where they were beaten by Anorthosis Famagusta 0–1, as well as in 2022 when they were beaten by Omonoia in a penalty shootout after a 0-0 score in normal and extra time.

European Competitions
Ethnikos competed in the UEFA Intertoto Cup six times: In 1998, 2003, 2004, 2006, 2007 and 2008. Five of those times, they were eliminated in the first round. However, in 2006, Ethnikos won the Intertoto Cup and was of the eleven winners of that year's competition. After eliminating Albanian side Partizani Tirana, they faced Croatian side NK Osijek. They tied both matches, but Ethnikos advanced on away goals, and became the first Cypriot team to have reached the third round of the Intertoto Cup. There, they beat Maccabi Petah Tikva 4–3 on aggregate, and became one of the competition's eleven winners. This meant that Ethnikos had qualified for the 2006–07 UEFA Cup.

In the UEFA Cup, Ethnikos eliminated Roeselare with a 2–1 loss in Belgium and a 5–0 victory in Cyprus, qualifying for the first round. They were eliminated by Lens after drawing the first leg at home (played at GSP Stadium, Nicosia) 0–0 and losing 3–1 in France. Because of their success in the Intertoto Cup, Ethnikos was named the Sports Team of the Year in 2006, by the Sports Journalists Union of Cyprus.

Honours

Domestic

League
 Cypriot Second Division:
 Winners (2): 1985–86, 1991–92

Cups
 Cypriot Cup:
 Runner-up (2): 2001–02, 2021–22

International
 UEFA Intertoto Cup:
 Joint Winner (1): 2006

Players

On loan
Out

Managers
 Stéphane Demol (2008–09)
 Panicos Orphanides (2009–10)
 Čedomir Janevski (2011–12)
 Stephen Constantine (2012–13)
 Danilo Dončić (2015–2016)
 Valdas Ivanauskas (2016–2017)
 Panayiotis Engomitis (2017)
 Giorgi Chikhradze (2017–2018)
 Panayiotis Engomitis (2018–)

History in European competition

Overall

Matches

Notes
 QR: Qualifying round
 1Q: First qualifying round
 2Q: Second qualifying round
 3Q: Third qualifying round
 PO: Play-off round

References

External links
 Official website 

 
Football clubs in Cyprus
Association football clubs established in 1968
1968 establishments in Cyprus